Labanda saturalis is a moth in the family Nolidae first described by Francis Walker in 1865. It is found in Indo-Australian tropics of India, Sri Lanka, and from New Guinea to the Solomon Islands.

Description
The forewings have green and blackish variegation. A diffuse sub-dorsal white patch can be seen from the distal end to the postmedial. Transverse fasciae are pale green and irregular.

References

Moths of Asia
Moths described in 1865
Chloephorinae